"Wobble" is the second single by rapper V.I.C. from his debut album Beast. The single was produced by Mr. Collipark. Before recording this song, he made a track called "Wobble (Skit)" to introduce the song "Wobble". Both tracks are on the album. Atlanta's V-103 former radio personality Frank Ski is featured on the song on the intro and bridge, but isn't credited as a featured artist. The song grew in popularity after inspiring a dance. "Wobble" finally made its debut on the US Hot R&B/Hip-Hop Songs chart at number 89 on June 2, 2011, almost three years after its release, and has since peaked at number 77. It went on to debut at number 94 on the US Billboard Hot 100 on January 7, 2012. In 2020, the song made a resurgence after trending on the video sharing platform TikTok.

Track listing

Promo CD single
"Wobble (Skit)" (Main)
"Wobble" (Song)
"Wobble" (Instrumental)
"Wobble" (Acapella)

Charts

Certifications

References 

2008 singles
2008 songs
American hip hop songs
Warner Records singles
Songs written by Mr. Collipark
Line dances
Music videos directed by Dale Resteghini
Southern hip hop songs